Bodonematidae is a family of nematodes belonging to the order Araeolaimida.

Genera:
 Bodonema Jensen, 1991

References

Nematodes